Kampala is the capital and largest city of Uganda. The city proper has a population of 1,680,000 and is divided into the five political divisions of Kampala Central Division, Kawempe Division, Makindye Division, Nakawa Division, and Rubaga Division.

Kampala's metropolitan area consists of the city proper and the neighboring Wakiso District, Mukono District, Mpigi District, Buikwe District and Luweero District.

In 2015, this metropolitan area generated an estimated nominal GDP of $13.80221 billion (constant US dollars of 2011) according to Xuantong Wang et al., which was more than half of Uganda's GDP for that year, indicating the importance of Kampala to Uganda's economy.

Kampala is reported to be among the fastest-growing cities in Africa, with an annual population growth rate of 4.03 percent, by City Mayors. Mercer (a New York-based consulting firm) has regularly ranked Kampala as East Africa's best city to live in, ahead of Nairobi and Kigali.

Etymology 

Kampala originally referred to only the present-day Old Kampala hill, on whose summit Fort Lugard was located, and the initial headquarters of the British colonial authorities in the soon to be Uganda Protectorate.

Before the British construction of Fort Lugard, the hill was a hunting reserve of the Kabaka (King) of Buganda and had several species of antelope, especially the impala. As a result, when the British colonial officials were allocated this hill by the then Kabaka (King) of Buganda, they referred to it as "The Hill of the Impala".

The Baganda, in whose territory this British settlement was located, then translated "Hill of the Impala" as Akasozi ke'Empala. This was then shortened to K'empala and finally Kampala. Kasozi means "hill", ke "of", and empala the plural of "impala". Hence the name "Kampala" came to refer to this initial British colonial settlement that would later on spread out from the occupied Old Kampala hill near the pre-existing Kibuga (capital) of the Buganda Kingdom.

History 

This area of numerous hills and swamps that later become known as Kampala was part of the core of the highly centralised Buganda Kingdom. It was also the site of the shifting Kibuga (capital) of the different Bassekabaka (kings) of the Buganda Kingdom, with each Kabaka (king) upon coronation, or subsequently during their reign, setting up their Kibuga (capital) on a new and or different hill as they wished or desired.

19th century
The first written description of this Kibuga (capital) was by the explorer Sir Richard Burton in his book, The Lake Region of East Africa, published in 1860. In the book, Burton, relying on the information collected by Snay Bin Amir, an Arab trader, described the Kibuga as

In 1862, when explorer John Speke arrived in Buganda, the Kibuga (capital) was at Bandabarogo, present-day Banda Hill, and the reigning Kabaka (King) was Mutesa I.

In 1875, explorer Henry Morton Stanley reported the capital as being at present-day Lubaga Hill where he met the same Kabaka, 
During this visit, Henry M. Stanley wrote a letter that was published in the Daily Telegraphy, inviting missionaries to come to Buganda. He also described the Kibuga in his 1870s dispatches to The New York Herald, thus:

In 1877, the first missionaries from the Church Mission Society, who were of the Protestant faith, arrived from the United Kingdom and were allocated Namirembe Hill. Two years later, in 1879, the Catholic White Fathers also arrived, first settling at the present day village of Kitebi near Lubaga; subsequently, they would be allocated Lubaga Hill. The arrival of these two missionary groups laid the ground for the religious wars of 1888 to 1892 between their new converts, and forced the missionaries from Great Britain to then lobby for the British government to take over Buganda/Uganda as a protectorate.

In 1890, Frederick Lugard, an agent of the Imperial British East Africa Company, arrived in Buganda during the reign of Ssekabaka Mwanga II, with whom he signed a treaty of protection by the British government over Buganda, and the Kibuga (capital) was located at Mengo Hill. Captain Lugard would, later on, be allocated the hill that would soon be known as Old Kampala, and on which he built a fort.

In 1895, Mengo Senior School, the first school offering Western education in Kampala, was opened by the Church Missionary Society at Namirembe hill, where mostly the children of chiefs and pages of the royal palaces were students.

In 1897, Ssekabaka Mwanga launched a rebellion but was defeated and was subsequently captured and exiled, in 1899, to the Seychelles alongside Omukama Kabalega, and his 3-year-old son was made Kabaka by the combined forces of the European officers leading Nubian and Baganda colonial soldiers. This state of affairs later culminated in the signing of the Buganda Agreement (1900) that formalised British colonial rule in Buganda.

Also in 1897, Kampala's first Western-style health facility, Mengo Hospital, was opened on Namirembe hill by British doctor and missionary Sir Albert Ruskin Cook. In addition, Sir Albert Ruskin Cook would in 1913 found Mulago Hospital, the current National Referral Hospital, at Mulago hill.

In 1899, the Missionary Sisters of Our Lady of Africa founded Lubaga Hospital on Lubaga Hill.

20th century
In 1900, the regents of the infant Kabaka Daudi Cwa II (who were Apolo Kagwa, the Katikiro (Prime Minister) of Buganda, Stanislaus Mugwanya, the Mulamuzi (Chief Judge) of Buganda, and Zakaria Kisingiri, the Muwanika (Chief Treasurer) of Buganda, with Bishop Alfred Tucker), signed the Buganda Agreement on behalf of Buganda with Sir Harry Johnston, who signed on behalf of the British government. 
This agreement with Sir Harry Johnston created new land tenures such as freehold, Crown land, and mailo, and divided up and allocated the land in such a way that would come to define the development of Kampala.
 
The land in Buganda's Kibuga (capital), including Mengo Hill and Makerere Hill, was allocated to the young Kabaka, the Baganda colonial collaborators, etc., under mailo and freehold.
The religious missions were also formally allocated land they were previously occupying. Thus, the Catholic White Fathers got Lubaga Hill, the Protestant Church Missionary Society got Namirembe Hill, the Muslims under Prince Nuhu Mbogo's leadership received Kibuli Hill, the British Catholic Mill Hill Missionaries received most of Nsambya Hill. The Uganda Protectorate government obtained land classified as Crown lands in the area such as Old Kampala Hill, Nakasero Hill, etc..

To legalise the above changes, the following laws and ordinances were subsequently passed: The Crown lands Ordinance of 1903, The Land Law of 1908, The Registration of Land Titles ordinance of 1922, and the Busulu and Envujo law of 1928.

In 1906, the Crown lands consisting of Old Kampala, Nakasero hills etc. and covering  was consolidated and gazetted as Kampala Township.

In 1912, Kampala Township received its first land-use plan and had a European and Asian population of 2,850.

In 1922, Kampala's oldest university, Makerere, was founded as the Uganda Technical College at the present Makerere Hill and initially offered carpentry, building construction, mechanics, arts, education, agriculture, and medicine.

In 1930, the first sewerage plan was prepared to target a population of 20,000 people in the Nakasero and Old Kampala  areas of the Kampala township. This plan guided sewerage development from 1936 to 1940 in planned urban areas of the Kampala Township and excluded the Kibuga area occupied by the Baganda and other natives.

In 1931, the Uganda Railway line reached Kampala, connecting Kampala to Mombasa Port, thirty-five years after the commencement of its construction.

In 1938, The East African Power & Lighting Company was granted a licence for thermal electric power generation and distribution for the towns of Kampala and Entebbe, and in the same year Sir Philip Mitchel, the Governor of Uganda, switched on Kampala and Uganda's first electric street lights.

In 1945, Ernst May, a German architect, was commissioned by the Uganda Protectorate Government to design a new physical plan for Kampala. Ernst May's plan of 1947 was intended to extend Kampala eastwards covering Kololo Hill and Naguru Hill, and with the commercial centre on the southern slopes of Nakasero Hill, an industrial zone in the southeast of Kampala, and, for the first time, a planned residential zone for the Ugandan natives. The plan was never fully implemented, and in 1951 the third physical plan by Henry Kendall was instead adopted, though it incorporated some elements of Ernst May's 1947 plan.

Henry Kendall's 1951 plan expanded Kampala from the  area of the 1930 plan to an area of  incorporating areas like Kololo Hill, and the Industrial Area. However, like the first two planning schemes, the 1951 plan failed to achieve many of its stated objectives.

On 9 October 1962, Uganda gained independence; subsequently the capital city was transferred from Entebbe to Kampala and in the same year, Kampala was granted city status.

In 1968, six years after Uganda attained independence, the boundaries of Kampala were expanded incorporating the Kibuga (then known as Mengo Municipality), Kawempe and Nakawa Townships, and areas including Muyenga and Ggaba.

In 1972, the fourth physical plan for Kampala was made covering the newly incorporated areas of Kampala's boundary extensions of 1968, but the subsequent political and economic turmoil of the 1970s and 1980s meant the plan was never implemented.

The Battle of Kampala during the Ugandan Bush War occurred in January 1986. It resulted in the capture of the city by the National Resistance Movement, led by Yoweri Museveni and the subsequent surrender of the Ugandan government.

Similarly, the fifth physical plan for Kampala, made in 1994, like the 1972 plan, was also never implemented.

21st century
In 2010, the Kampala Capital City Authority Act was enacted, giving the Ugandan Government more control of the administration of Kampala. The act also created the Kampala Metropolitan Physical Planning Authority with the stated aims of improving the infrastructure of the City of Kampala and the surrounding districts of Wakiso, Mukono, Buikwe, Mpigi and Luwero.

On 11 July 2010, al-Shabaab suicide bombers killed 74 people.

Geography

Topography 

Kampala is a hilly place with its valleys filled with sluggish rivers/ swamps.

Hills 

Kampala was originally built on seven hills, but it has expanded to cover more than the original seven hills.

The original seven hills are:

 Old Kampala Hill on which Fort Lugard was located, the first seat of the British colonial authorities in colonial Uganda.
 The second is Mengo Hill which was the then Kibuga (capital) of Buganda kingdom at the start of British colonial rule.
 The third is Kibuli Hill, that is home to the Kibuli Mosque.
 The fourth is Namirembe Hill, that was home to the Anglican (Wangeleza) faction of the Buganda religious wars of 1888 to 1892 and site of Namirembe Anglican Cathedral.
 The fifth is Lubaga Hill, that was home to the White Fathers Catholic (Wafaransa) faction of the above-mentioned Buganda religious wars and also site of the Rubaga Catholic Cathedral.
 The sixth is Nsambya Hill, site of the former Cathedral of St Peter's Nsambya and allocated to the British Catholic Mill Hill Mission during the signing of the Uganda Agreement (1900).
 The seventh is Nakasero Hill on whose summit was Fort Nakasero,  a British military installation built after relocating from Fort Lugard in Old Kampala. The hill was also the site of the European Hospital (the current government analytical laboratory opposite Ministry of Public Service headquarters).

Swamps and slow rivers 
Due to Kampala's hilly nature and tropical climate, the valleys have slow rivers/swamps that tend to flow southwards towards Lake Victoria or northwards. These seasonal and or permanent swamps cover 15% of Kampala's land area. They include:
 Kinawataka swamp river covering an area of   flowing southwards into Lake Victoria and is located in Nakawa Division.
 Nakivubo swamp river covering an area of  flowing southwards to Lake Victoria from the foothills of Makerere and of length .
Lubigi swamp covering an area of  flowing westwards from the foothills of Kisaasi into the Mayanja River.
 Kansanga swamp
 Kyetinda swamp

Vegetation 
Kampala, due to the diversity of habitats that include wetlands and hills, was previously covered with short-grasses on the tops of the hills, elephant grass (Pennisetum purpureum Schumach.), Cyperus papyrus, African water lily etc. in the swamps and evergreen forests with trees such as African olive (mpafu) and Natal fig (mutuba).

Geology 
Kampala is located on the East African Plateau between the two arms of the East African Rift  and on the northern limits of Tanzania Craton.

Climate 
Kampala has a tropical rainforest climate (Af) under the Köppen-Geiger climate classification system.

A facet of Kampala's weather is that it features two annual wetter seasons. While the city does not have a true dry season month, it experiences heavier precipitation from August to December and from February to June.

Education 

Pre-primary education

Pre-primary education is offered only by private entities which are located in the various neighborhoods of Kampala, and is lightly regulated by the Ministry of Education and Sports and starts from age of 6 weeks. Education in Kampala city is provided by a vast number of public and private institutions offering a wide range of educational training that includes pre-primary, primary, secondary, vocational, technical undergraduate and post-graduate education.

Primary and secondary education in Kampala

Kampala has a number of both primary and secondary schools in every parish that are mostly privately owned and a handful that are state-owned and are also lightly regulated by the City Education directorate and Ministry of Education and Sports.

Some of the private institutions:

Vocational and technical education in Kampala

Kampala has a number of both private and state institutions offering training in a broad range of fields as indicated in the table below:

Demographics 

The population of Kampala city proper has been rapidly increasing from 62,264 in 1948 to 1,189,142 in 2002, then 1,507,080 in 2014. In 2019, the population was estimated to be 1,650,800.

Kampala, being the capital city and economic engine of Uganda, has a diverse ethnic population drawn from all parts of the country and also from neighboring countries such as Democratic Republic of the Congo, Rwanda, South Sudan, Eritrea, Somalia, and even from countries as far away as India and China.

Cross-cultural intimate relations in Kampala and even Uganda as a whole are still unusual. Although many of Kampala's residents live and work in close contact, they still define themselves by their ethnic origins. This is more evident in the native languages (alongside Luganda and English) that are used at home, work places, and public spaces. In addition to the Baganda and Banyankole, other large ethnic groups include the Basoga, Bafumbira, Batoro, Bakiga, Alur, Bagisu (better known as Bamasaba), Banyoro, Iteso, Langi, and Acholi.

Historical population data for Kampala

Culture

Cultural institutions 
Prominent institutions include the Uganda Museum and the Ugandan National Theatre.

Ndere Cultural Centre 
A prominent cultural centre in the Kampala area of Kisasi that aims to promote Ugandan and African cultural expressions through music, dance, and drama. The name Ndere is derived from the noun 'endere', which means flute. As an instrument found in all cultures, it is chosen as a peaceful symbol of the universality of cultural expressions. The Ndere centre is famous for its Ndere troupe, a music and dance troupe that perform several nights every week at the centre showcasing music and dance from all over Uganda as well as Rwanda and Burundi.

Sports 
Kampala is home to the City Oilers, one of East Africa's top basketball club teams. It is the only East African team that competes in the FIBA Africa Clubs Champions Cup. The Oilers play their home games in the MTN Arena, which is based in Kampala's Lugogo Area.

The city hosted the IAAF World Cross Country Championships in 2017.

Notable people 
Apollo Milton Obote, led Uganda to independence in 1962
Yoweri Kaguta Museveni, the longest serving president of the Republic Of Uganda
Nancy Kacungira, presenter and reporter at BBC World News, winner of the first ever BBC Komla Dumor Award
 Robert Kyagulanyi Ssentamu, Ugandan politician, businessman, entrepreneur, philanthropist and musician
 Micheal Azira, Ugandan footballer, who plays for the  New Mexico United in the USL Championship
 Allen Kagina, executive director, Uganda National Roads Authority, UNRA
 Yasmin Alibhai-Brown, British journalist and author
 Cornelius Boza-Edwards, former boxer
 Ellinor Catherine Cunningham van Someren, scientist
 Esther Nakajjigo, humanitarian and human rights activist
 Richard Gibson, British actor
 Mandy Juruni, basketball coach
 Aamito Lagum, fashion model, winner of the first season of Africa's Next Top Model
 John Mugabi, world champion boxer
 Muteesa I, the 30th Kabaka of Buganda
 Muwenda Mutebi II of Buganda, the 36th Kabaka of Buganda
 Pepe Julian Onziema, human rights activist
 Rajat Neogy, Ugandan-Indian journalist, writer, poet and founder and editor of Transition Magazine
 Shimit Amin, Uganda-born Indian filmmaker
 Salma Lakhani, Lieutenant Governor for the Province of Alberta
 Sudhir Ruparelia, Ugandan entrepreneur and builder, Founder Chairman of Ruparelia Group
 Paulo Muwanga, former president and prime minister
 Denis Onyango, footballer
 Moses Magogo Hassim, FUFA President who took Uganda Cranes to AFCON after 39 years and first Ugandan on CAF Executive
 Samuel Sejjaaka, professor
 Wasswa Serwanga, American football player
 Marcel Theroux, British novelist
 Erias Lukwago, Ugandan lawyer and politician and the Lord Mayor of Kampala City
 Phiona Mutesi, chess prodigy and subject of the 2012 book and 2016 Disney film Queen of Katwe
 Martin Ssempa, pastor-doctor and head of a large congregation
 Pione Sisto, footballer, Ugandan born Danish footballer, playing for Danish Club FC Midtjylland and the Danish National football team.
 John Sentamu, Archbishop of York
 Ash Amin, British academic and geographer
 Julius Kakeeto, Bank executive and CEO of PostBank Uganda
 Jennifer Musisi, former execute Director of Kampala Capital City Authority
 Joshua Cheptegei, long-distance runner, world-record holder in the 10,000 metres and 5000 metres
 Jacob Kiplimo, long-distance runner, world-record holder in the Half marathon

People awarded the honorary citizenship of Kampala are:

Economy 

Some of the businesses that maintain their headquarters in the city center include all of the 25 commercial banks licensed in Uganda; the New Vision Group, the leading news media conglomerate and majority owned by the government; and the Daily Monitor publication, a member of the Kenya-based Nation Media Group. Air Uganda maintained its headquarters in an office complex on Kololo Hill in Kampala.

The informal sector is a large contributor to Kampala's GDP. Citizens who work in the formal sector also participate in informal activities to earn more income for their families. A public servant in Kampala, for example, may engage in agriculture in addition to working in the formal sector. Other informal fields include owning taxis and urban agriculture. The use of Kampala's wetlands for urban farming has increased over the past few decades. It connects the informal rural settlements with the more industrialized parts of the city. The produce grown in the wetlands is sold in markets in the urban areas.

In December 2015, Google launched its first Wi-Fi network in Kampala.

While more than 30 percent of Kampala's inhabitants practice urban agriculture, the city of Kampala donated  to promote urban agriculture in the northeastern parish of Kyanja, in Nakawa Division.

Transport 
Kampala is served by Entebbe International Airport, which is the largest airport in Uganda.

Boda-bodas (local motorbike transport) are a popular mode of transport that gives access to many areas within and outside the city. Standard fees for these range from USh:1,000 to 2,000 or more. Boda-bodas are useful for passing through rush-hour traffic, although many are poorly maintained and dangerous.

In early 2007, it was announced that Kampala would remove commuter taxis from its streets and replace them with a comprehensive city bus service. (In Kampala, the term "taxi" refers to a 15-seater minibus used as public transport.) The bus service was expected to cover the greater Kampala metropolitan area including Mukono, Mpigi, Bombo, Entebbe, Wakiso and Gayaza.  the service had not yet started. Having successfully completed the Northern Bypass, the government, in collaboration with its stakeholders, now plans to introduce the bus rapid transit (BRT) system in Kampala by 2014. On 12 March 2012, Pioneer Easy Bus Company, a private transport company, started public bus service in Kampala with an estimated 100 buses each with a 60-passenger capacity (30 seated and 30 standing), acquired from China. Another 422 buses were expected in the country in 2012. The buses operate 24 hours daily. The company has a concession to provide public transport in the city for the next five years. The buses were impounded for back taxes in December 2013. The company expected to resume operation in February 2015.

In 2014, Uganda's President Yoweri Museveni and a Chinese transportation company signed a Memorandum of Understanding, to embark at some point on building a light rail system in Kampala, similar to the one in Addis Ababa, Ethiopia.

On 11 April 2011, the pressure group Activists for Change (A4C) held its first Walk to Work protest near Kampala, in response to a comment by President Museveni on the increased cost of fuel, which had risen by 50 percent between January and April 2011. He said: "What I call on the public to do is to use fuel sparingly. Don't drive to bars." The protest, which called on workers to walk to work to highlight the increased cost of transport in Uganda, was disrupted by police, who fired tear gas and arrested three-time presidential candidate Kizza Besigye and Democratic Party leader Norbert Mao. In the course of the protest, Besigye was shot in the right arm by a rubber bullet. The government blamed the violence on protesters.

In 2016, the Rift Valley Railways Consortium (RVR) and Kampala Capital City Authority established passenger rail service between Namanve and Kampala and between Kampala and Kyengera. Those services were temporarily discontinued after RVR lost its concession in Uganda in October 2017. However, when Uganda Railways Corporation took over the operations of the metre gauge railway system in Uganda in 2018, the service was restored in February that year. A new Kampala to Port Bell route is being planned to be added in the 2018/2019 financial year.

Places of worship 

Among the places of worship are predominantly Christian churches and temples: Roman Catholic Archdiocese of Kampala (Catholic Church), Church of Uganda (Anglican Communion), Presbyterian Church in Uganda (World Communion of Reformed Churches), Baptist Union of Uganda (Baptist World Alliance), and Assemblies of God. There are also Muslim mosques.

Kampala hosts a Bahá'í House of Worship known as the Mother Temple of Africa which is situated on Kikaya Hill in the outskirts of the city. The temple was inaugurated in January 1961.

Gallery

See also 

 List of banks in Uganda
 List of tallest buildings in Kampala
 Timeline of Kampala#Bibliography
 Wakaliwood – A film studio based in Kampala

References

External links 

 

 
Capitals in Africa
Cities in the Great Rift Valley
Populated places in Central Region, Uganda
Populated places on Lake Victoria